Edward Marcus Ronan (born September 19, 1969, in Ozark, Alabama) is a retired Major League Baseball catcher who played in six games for the St. Louis Cardinals in . Ronan also spent eleven seasons in the minor league organizations of the Cardinals, Florida Marlins, New York Yankees, Houston Astros and Philadelphia Phillies.

External links

1969 births
Living people
Arkansas Travelers players
Charlotte Knights players
Columbus Clippers players
Hamilton Redbirds players
Louisville Redbirds players
Major League Baseball catchers
Baseball players from Alabama
New Orleans Zephyrs players
People from Ozark, Alabama
Savannah Cardinals players
Scranton/Wilkes-Barre Red Barons players
Springfield Cardinals players
St. Louis Cardinals players
St. Petersburg Cardinals players
Florida State Seminoles baseball players
Alaska Goldpanners of Fairbanks players